Axel Krause, born 23 October 1958 in Halle (Saale), is a German painter and graphic artist. He is associated with the New Leipzig School and lives and works in Leipzig. He studied at the Hochschule für Grafik und Buchkunst Leipzig in 1981–1986. He taught at the school in 1989–1999 and worked for the Leipzig Opera in 1990–1993.

He paints with acrylic and oil. Typical for the New Leipzig School, Krause paints figurative subjects with mysterious and surreal elements and uses collage techniques. His interiors, landscapes and atmospheric scenes have been compared to American realists such as Edward Hopper. He has garnered controversy due to his anti-immigration posts online, which resulted in his gallery show being cancelled.

Solo exhibitions
 1989 Galerie Süd, Leipzig
 1994 Galerie Blüthner, Leipzig
 1994 Panoramamuseum, Bad Frankenhausen
 1994 Galerie Jüdenstraße, Wittenberg
 1999 Städtische Galerie, Wesseling b. Cologne
 2001 Westfalsches Haus, Leipzig - Markkleeberg
 2002 Inter Art Galerie Reich, Cologne
 2003 Neue Chemnitzer Kunsthütte, Chemnitz
 2005 Gespann, Galerie Kleindienst, Leipzig
 2007 Heimsuchung, Galerie Kleindienst, Leipzig
 2007 Axel Krause solo exhibition, Gallery LM, Seoul, South Korea
 2010 Schwarzmeer, Galerie Kleindienst, Leipzig
 2012 Malerei/Graphik, Galerie Ratswall, Bitterfeld
 2012 New Works, Gallery LVS, Seoul
 2015 Spätfilm, Galerie Kleindienst, Leipzig

Bibliography
 2001 Convoy Leipzig, (catalogue), Biksady Galerie, Budapest
 2001 Axel Krause - Zur See (catalogue), Galerie Kleindienst, Leipzig
 2004 Axel Krause, in LVZ, 10.12.2004
 2005 Axel Krause - Malerei (catalogue), Galerie Kleindienst, Leipzig
 2006 Zurück zur Figur, Malerei der Gegenwart (catalogue), Kunsthalle der Hypo-Kulturstiftung, Munich
 2006 Meinhard Michael: Die neue Leipziger Schule, LVZ, 09.01.2006
 2008 Aussellungskatalog, Gallery LVS, Seoul (South Korea)
 2010 Meinhard Michael: Leipzig malt, LVZ, 03/2010 
 2010 Anna Kaleri: Die synthetische Ordnung der Dinge, LVZ, 04/2010
 2011 Kunstwerkstatt - Axel Krause (artist book), Prestel Verlag

References

1958 births
20th-century German painters
20th-century German male artists
21st-century German painters
21st-century German male artists
German contemporary artists
German male painters
Living people
People from Halle (Saale)
Academic staff of the Hochschule für Grafik und Buchkunst Leipzig